Bicyrtes viduatus is a species of sand wasp in the family Crabronidae.  It is found in Central America.

It is characterized by a pale yellow coloration, while lacking the thoracic "smiley face" pattern present on Bicyrtes capnopterus and Bicyrtes ventralis, the other two species in Bicyrtes having a yellow coloration. Additionally, the submarginal cell is clouded, while the wings remain largely clear.

References

Further reading

 
 
 

Crabronidae
Insects described in 1889